Asadullah Sa'adati is an ethnic Hazara politician in Afghanistan. He was the representative of this province during the 16th term of Afghanistan Parliament.

Early life 
Asadullah Saadati was born on 2 April 1974 in Shahristan District of Daykundi province.
He completed his school education in his city in Daikundi and obtained a bachelor's degree in (Dari-Persian) language from Kabul University in 2005.

See also 
 List of Hazara people

Notes 

Living people
1974 births
Hazara politicians
Hezbe Wahdat politicians
People from Daykundi Province
Kabul University alumni